The 2021–22 season is the club's eight season in Indian Super League since its establishment in 2014. The 2021–22 Indian Super League season started from 19 November 2021.

Season overview 

The Highlanders are all set rope in Spanish midfielder Hernan Santana and Sehnaj Singh and have extended Khassa Camara’s contract, as reported earlier by Khel Now. The club has also signed Joe Zoherliana, Jestin George, and Mohammed Irshad under the guidance of Khalid Jamil who is set to continue as head coach.

On 27 October 2021, NorthEast United are completed the signing of Australian defender Patrick Flottmann from Sydney FC on a free transfer. The Highlanders first signed South Korean defender Ahn Byung-keon, but couldn’t register him due to some issues.

On 29 October 2021, NorthEast United have completed the signing of Gani Ahmed Nigam.

On 31 October 2021, NorthEast United have completed the signing of Manvir Singh. The striker played for Sudeva FC in the last I-League season and has signed a 3-year-deal with the Highlanders.

November 

On 7 November 2021, NorthEast United FC confirmed the signing of Pragyan Medhi on its social media and various other platforms for the upcoming season. He has signed with NorthEast United on a four–year deal.

On 17 November 2021, NorthEast United announced BKT as their Official Partner for the upcoming season.

On 18 November 2021, NorthEast United announced their partnership with Amrit Cement as their Principal sponsor.

On 19 November, the NorthEast United launched their away-kit and third kit for the upcoming season.

On 20 November 2021, NorthEast United lost 2–4 against Bengaluru FC in their first Indian Super League match of the season. Deshorn Brown and Mathias Coureur are the Goalscorer for the Highlanders.

On 25 November, the NorthEast United played their second match against Kerala Blasters FC, which ended in a 0–0 draw.

On 27 November 2021, NorthEast United announced Health Vit as their Official Nutrition Partner for the upcoming season.

On 29 November 2021, NorthEast United lost 1–2 against Chennaiyin FC in their third Indian Super League match of the season. V.P. Suhair is the Goalscorer for the Highlanders.

December 

On 1 December 2021, NorthEast United announced Akshar Foundation as their Official Partner for the upcoming season.

On 4 December 2021, NorthEast United defeated FC Goa 2–1 at home match. Goal from Rochharzela and Khassa Camara ensured their first victory of the season.

On 10 December 2021, NorthEast United lost 0–1 against Odisha FC at away match.

On 13 December 2021, NorthEast United lost 1–5 against Hyderabad FC. Laldanmawia Ralte is the only goalscorer for the Highlanders.

On 17 December 2021, NorthEast United defeated East Bengal 2–0 at home match. Goals from V.P. Suhair and Patrick Flottman ensured victory for Highlanders.

On 21 December 2021, NorthEast United lost 2–3 against ATK Mohun Bagan. VP Suhair and Mashoor Shereef are the goalscorer for the Highlanders.

On 27 November 2021, the NorthEast United played their home match against Mumbai City, which ended in a 3–3 draw. Deshorn Brown is the Goalscorer for NorthEast United who Scored a hat-trick.

On 29 December 2021, NorthEast United assistant manager Alison Kharsyntiew left the club due to family issue.

January 

On 6 January 2022, NorthEast United sign Indian Super League golden boot winner Marcelinho from Rajasthan United on loan deal. NorthEast United lost 2–3 against Jamshedpur. Brown scored two goals for the Highlanders.

On 13 January 2022, Khelnow confirmed that NorthEast United signed Senegalese defender Zakaria Diallo for the rest of the season. NorthEast United also terminate their contract with Khassa Camara due to his engagements with AFCON that rules him out for a majority of matches in the second phase of Indian Super League.

On 14 January 2022, NorthEast United drew 1–1 with Goa at away match. Hernán scored first for the  Highlanders, but Goa equalized shortly after, courtesy of Airam Cabrera.

On 18 January 2022, NorthEast United lost to Odisha 2–0 at home match. Daniel Lalhlimpuia and Aridai Cabrera scored for Odisha.

On 21 January 2022, NorthEast United confirmed the signing of Marco Sahanek on its social media and various other platforms for the rest of the season.

On 22 January 2022, NorthEast United lost to Chennaiyin 1–2 in away match. Danmawia score a goal in 35 minutes for the Highlanders.

On 25 January 2022, NorthEast United drew 1–1 against Mumbai City at away match. Ahmed Jahouh scored a penalty for the Islanders, but Mohammed Irshad equalized the score in 79th minutes.

On 31 January 2022, NorthEast United lost to Hyderabad 0–5 at home match.

February 

On 4 February 2022, NorthEast United lost to Kerala Blasters in 1–2 at away match, with Jorge Pereyra Díaz and Álvaro Vázquez scoring for the Blasters. Mohammed Irshad scored in the last minute for a late consolation.

On 12 February, NorthEast United lost 1–3 against ATK Mohun Bagan.

On 18 February, the Highlanders defeated Bengaluru 2–1. Deshorn Brown and Danmawia scored for Highlanders.

On 25 February, NorthEast United lost 2–3 against Jamshedpur. Danamawia and Marcelinho are the goalscorer for NorthEast United.

On 28 February, NorthEast United drew 1–1 with East Bengal in their last match of the Indian Super League season. Marco Sahanek scored for the Highlanders and Antonio Perošević equalising in the second half for East Bengal.

Players 
Current squad of the club:

Transfers

IN

Contract Extensions

Out

Loans in

Competitions

Pre-season and friendlies

Indian Super League

Result summary

Results by round

Matches 
The season fixtures for the first 10 matches were released on 13 September. NorthEast United began their campaign against Bengaluru FC on 20 November 2021.

Statistics

Squad statistics

|-
!colspan=14 |Goalkeepers

|-
!colspan=14 |Defenders

|-
!colspan=14 |Midfielders

|-
!colspan=14 |Forwards

|-
! colspan=14 style=background:#dcdcdc; text-align:center|Players who left the club during the season

|}

Goalscorers

Hat-tricks

(H) – Home; (A) – Away

Assist

Clean sheets

Disciplinary record

Injury record

Notes

See also
 NorthEast United FC
 Indian Super League
 2021–22 Indian Super League season

References 

NorthEast United FC seasons
2021–22 Indian Super League season by team